The textile and clothing industries provide a single source of growth in Bangladesh's rapidly developing economy. Exports of textiles and garments are the principal source of foreign exchange earnings.  By 2002 exports of textiles, clothing, and ready-made garments (RMG) accounted for 77% of Bangladesh's total merchandise exports.

In 1972, the World Bank approximated the gross domestic product (GDP) of Bangladesh at US$6.29 billion, and it grew to $368 billion by 2021, with $46 billion of that generated by exports, 82% of which was ready-made garments.  As of 2016 Bangladesh held the 2nd place in producing garments just after China.  Bangladesh is the world's second-largest apparel exporter of western fast fashion brands. Sixty percent of the export contracts of western brands are with European buyers and about thirty percent with American buyers and ten percent to others. Only 5% of textile factories are owned by foreign investors, with most of the production being controlled by local investors.  In the financial year 2016-2017 the RMG industry generated US$28.14 billion, which was 80.7% of the total export earnings in exports and 12.36% of the GDP; the industry was also taking on green manufacturing practices.

Bangladesh's textile industry has been part of the trade versus aid debate. The encouragement of the garment industry of Bangladesh as an open trade regime is argued to be a much more effective form of assistance than foreign aid. Tools such as quotas through the WTO Agreement on Textiles and Clothing (ATC) and Everything but Arms (EBA) and the US 2009 Tariff Relief Assistance in the global clothing market have benefited entrepreneurs in Bangladesh's ready-made garments (RMG) industry. In 2012 the textile industry accounted for 45% of all industrial employment in the country yet only contributed 5% of the Bangladesh's total national income.
After several building fires and collapses, resulting in the deaths of thousands of workers, the Bangladeshi textile industry and its buyers have faced criticism. Many are concerned with possible worker safety violations and are working to have the government increase safety standards. The role of women is important in the debate as some argue that the textile industry has been an important means of economic security for women while others focus on the fact that women are disproportionately textile workers and thus are disproportionately victims of such accidents. Measures have been taken to ensure better working conditions, but many still argue that more can be done. Despite the hurdles, riding the growth wave, Bangladesh apparel making sector could reach 60 percent value addition threshold relying on the strong backwardly linked yarn-fabric making factories directly from imported raw cotton, reaching a new height of exports worth of US$30.61 billion in the fiscal year 2018.

History of textile production in Bangladesh

Early history

Under Mughal rule, Bengal Subah was a midpoint of the worldwide muslin and silk trades during the 16th to 18th centuries. During the Mughal era, the most important center of cotton production was Bengal, particularly around its capital city of Dhaka, leading to muslin being called "daka" in distant markets such as Central Asia. Bengal also exported cotton and silk textiles to markets such as Europe, Indonesia and Japan. Bengal produced more than 50% of textiles and around 80% of silks imported by the Dutch from Asia, for example.

Bengal was conquered by the British East India Company after the Battle of Plassey in 1757 and the Bengal Presidency was founded in 1765. British colonization forced open the Bengali market to British goods, while at the same time Britain implemented protectionist policies such as bans and high tariffs that restricted imports of Bengali cotton cloth to Britain. Britain imported raw cotton from Bengal, without taxes or tariffs, for British factories, which used it to manufacture textiles, many of which were exported back to Bengal. British economic policies led to deindustrialization in Bengal.

Post-1971

From 1947 to 1971 the textile industry, like most industries in East Pakistan, were largely owned by West Pakistanis. During that period, in the 1960s, local Bengali entrepreneurs had set up their own large textile and jute factories. Following its separation from West Pakistan, the newly formed Bangladesh lost access to both capital and technical expertise.

Until the liberation of Bangladesh in 1971, the textile sector was primarily part of the process of import substitution industrialization (ISI) to replace imports. After the liberation, Bangladesh adopted export-oriented industrialization (EOI) by focusing on the textile and clothing industry, particularly the readymade garment (RMG) sector. Immediately after the founding of Bangladesh (1971), tea and jute were the most export-oriented sectors. But with the constant threat of flooding, declining jute fiber prices and a significant decrease in world demand, the contribution of the jute sector to the country's economy deteriorated.

In 1972 the newly formed government of Sheikh Mujibur Rahman who was also the head of the Awami League, enacted the Bangladesh Industrial Enterprises (Nationalization) Order, taking over privately owned textile factories and creating a state-owned enterprise (SOE) called Bangladesh Textile Mills Corporation (BTMC). President Rahman promoted democracy and a socialist form of capitalism. The BTMC never managed to match the pre-1971 output and in every year after the 1975–1976 fiscal year, lost money. Until the early 1980s the state owned almost all spinning mills in Bangladesh and 85 percent the textile industry's assets (not including small businesses). Under the 1982 New Industrial Policy (NPI) a large number of these assets including jute mills and textile mills were privatized and returned to their original owners.

In the devastating famine in 1974, one million people died, mainly of starvation caused in part by the flooding of the Brahmaputra river in 1974, and a steep rise in the price of rice. Partly in response to the economic and political repercussions of the famine, the Bangladeshi government shifted public policy away from its concentration on a socialist economy, and began to denationalize, disinvest and reduce the role of the public sector in the textile industry while encouraging private sector participation. The 1974 New Investment Policy restored the rights to both private and foreign investors. Bangladesh's development model switched from a state-sponsored capitalist mode of industrial development with mainly state-owned enterprises (SOE) to private sector-led industrial growth.

Post-liberation war, Bangladesh continued to focus on the agricultural sector to feed its rural and poor masses. Even in 1978, there were only nine "export-oriented" garment manufacturing units. That same year the first direct export of garments, 10,000 shirts to a Parisian firm, was shipped from a Bangladeshi firm. The Bangladeshi government began to realize potential for the industry to flourish and offered development stimulus such as "duty-free import machinery and raw materials, bonded warehouse facilities and cash incentives."

Readymade garment (RMG) industry

RMGs are the finished textile product from clothing factories and the Bangladeshi RMG Sector is one of the fastest growing sectors in the Bangladeshi economy, with a growth rate of 55% from 2002 to 2012. Exports of textiles, clothing, and ready-made garments (RMG) accounted for 77% of Bangladesh's total merchandise exports in 2002.
By 2005 the (RMG) industry was the only multibillion-dollar manufacturing and export industry in Bangladesh, accounting for 75 per cent of the country's earnings in that year. Bangladesh's export trade is now dominated by the ready-made garments (RMG) industry. In 2012 Bangladesh's garment exports – mainly to the US and Europe – made up nearly 80% of the country's export income. By 2014 the RMG industry represented 81.13 percent of Bangladesh's total export. Much of the tremendous growth of the sector and its role as an economic powerhouse for the country is attributed to the availability of "cheap" labor. Of the four million workers employed by the RMG industry, 85% are illiterate women from rural villages. The working environments and conditions of the factories that produce ready-made garments has undergone criticism in recent years concerning worker safety and fair wages.

Subcontracting is a major component of the RMG industry in Bangladesh. Many Western companies contract different factories, only requesting that certain quotas be met at certain times. Companies prefer subcontracting because the degree of separation presumably removes them of liability of wage and labor violations. It also makes it easier to distribute production across a variety of sources.

World markets

McKinsey report (2011): Bangladesh as next hot spot, next China
As of 2011 Bangladesh was second largest ready-made garments (RMG) manufacturer after China, by the next five years Bangladesh will become the largest ready-made garments manufacturer. Bangladesh was the sixth largest exporter of apparel in the world after China, the EU, Hong Kong, Turkey and India in 2006. In 2006 Bangladesh's share in the world apparel exports was 2.8%. The US was the largest single market with US$3.23 billion in exports, a 30% share in 2007. Today, the US remains the largest market for Bangladesh's woven garments taking US$2.42 billion, a 47% share of Bangladesh's total woven exports. The European Union remains the largest regional destination - Bangladesh exported US$5.36 billion in apparel; 50% of their total apparel exports. The EU took a 61% share of Bangladeshi knitwear with US$3.36 billion exports.

According to a 2011 report by international consulting firm McKinsey & Company, 80 percent of American and European clothing companies planned to move their outsourcing from China, where wages had risen, and were considering Bangladesh as the "next hot spot" making it the "next China" offering 'the lowest price possible' known as the China Price, the hallmark of China's incredibly cheap, ubiquitous manufacturers, much "dreaded by competitors."

Trade agreements

1974 the Multi Fibre Arrangement (MFA) and the Daewoo of South Korea

Starting in 1974 the Multi Fibre Arrangement (MFA) in the North American market ensured that trade in textiles and garments remained the most regulated in the world. Among other things the MFA set quotas on garments exports from the newly industrialising countries of Asia, but had exceptions, most notably the state of Bangladesh. Entrepreneurs from quota-restricted countries like South Korea began "quota hopping" seeking quota-free countries that could become quota-free manufacturing sites.  The export-oriented readymade garment industry emerged at this time. Daewoo of South Korea was an early entrant in Bangladesh, when it established a joint venture on 27 December 1977 with Desh Garments Ltd. making it the first export oriented ready-made garment industry in Bangladesh. After only one year in which 130 Desh supervisors and managers received free training from Daewoo in production and marketing at Daewoo's state-of-the-art ready-made garment plant in Korea, 115 of the 130 left Desh Garments Ltd. and set up separate private garment export firms or began working for other newly formed export-oriented RMG companies with new garment factories in Bangladesh for much higher salaries than Desh Garments Ltd offered.

Global restructuring processes, including two non-market factors, such as quotas under Multi Fibre Arrangement (MFA) (1974–2005) in the North American market and preferential market access to European markets, led to the "emergence of an export-oriented garment industry in Bangladesh in the late 1970s." It was uncertain what the phase out of the MFA meant for the Bangladeshi RMG industry. However, surpassing all doubts, the industry continued to succeed and dominate on a global level.

The garment industry in Bangladesh became the main export sector and a major source of foreign exchange starting in 1980, and exported about US$5 billion in 2002. In 1980 an export processing zone was officially established in at the port of Chittagong.

By 1981, 300 textile companies, many small ones had been denationalized often returned to their original owners.  In 1982, shortly after coming to power following a bloodless coup, President Hussain Muhammad Ershad introduced the New Industrial Policy (NPI), most significant move in the privatization process,  which denationalized much of the textile industry, created export processing zones (EPZs) and encouraged direct foreign investment. Under the New Industrial Policy (NPI) 33 jute mills and 27 textile mills were returned to their original owners.

In 1985 the US and Canada actually imposed import quotas of their own, with no international agreement, on Bangladeshi textiles. However, Bangladesh was able to meet demand for every quota each year and was able to successfully negotiate for higher quotas for subsequent years.

The export of ready-made garments (RMG) increased from US$3.5 million in 1981 to  $10.7 billion in 2007. Apparel exports grew, but initially, the ready-made garments RMG industry was not adequately supported by the growth up and down the domestic supply chain (e.g., spinning, weaving, knitting, fabric processing, and the accessories industries).

From 1995 to 2005 the WTO Agreement on Textiles and Clothing (ATC) was in effect, wherein more industrialized countries consented to export fewer textiles while less industrialized countries enjoyed increased quotas for exporting their textiles.  Throughout the 10-year agreement, Bangladesh's economy benefited from quota-free access to European markets and desirable quotas for the American and Canadian markets.

As the above table shows, the market shares for Bangladeshi textiles in the US and both textiles and clothing in the European Union have changed during the time period of the ATC.

Until FY 1994, Bangladesh's ready-made garments (RMG) industry was mostly dependent on imported fabrics - the Primary Textile Sector (PTS) was not producing the necessary fabrics and yarn.

Since the early 1990s, the knit section expanded mainly producing and exporting shirts, T-shirts, trousers, sweaters and jackets. In 2006, 90 percent of Bangladesh's total earnings from garment exports came from its exports to the United States and Europe.

Although there was concern, noted in an IMF report, that the WTO's Multi Fibre Arrangement, the Agreement on Textiles and Clothing (ATC), phase-out would shut down the textile and clothing (T&C) industry, the Bangladesh textile sector actually grew tremendously after 2004 and reached an export turnover of US$10.7 billion in FY 2007. Bangladesh was expected to suffer the most from the ending of the MFA, as it was expected to face more competition, particularly from China. However, this was not the case. It turns out that even in the face of other economic giants, Bangladesh's labor is "cheaper than anywhere else in the world." While some smaller factories were documented making pay cuts and layoffs, most downsizing was essentially speculative – the orders for goods kept coming even after the MFA expired. In fact, Bangladesh's exports increased in value by about $500 million in 2006.

Textile exports from Bangladesh to the United States did increase by 10% in 2009.

US Tariff Relief Assistance for Developing Economies Act
The United States introduced the Tariff Relief Assistance for Developing Economies Act of 2009  designated Bangladesh as one of the 14 least developed countries (LDC), as defined by the United Nations and the US State Department, eligible for "duty-free access for apparel assembled in those countries and exported to the U.S." from 2009 through 2019. The Bangladesh Garment Manufacturers and Exporters Association (BGMEA), an industry lobby group, claimed that in 2008 alone Bangladesh paid US$576 million as duty against its export of nearly $3 billion, mainly consisting of woven and knitwear. However, this act was temporarily suspended for Bangladesh by President Obama after the Rana Plaza collapse in 2013.

Effects on exports 
Md. Samsul Alam and Kaoru Natsuda's survey of Bangladeshi garment firms, conducted in 2012, found that they almost unanimously credited the low cost of labor as the main contributor to the industry's growth in Bangladesh. Some Bangladeshi companies have purchased machinery and technology to increase efficiency, such as computerized cutting and spreading machinery, sewing machines, and barcode-enable inventory management systems. Market access and trade policy also have played a role in the growth of the Bangladeshi garment industry, as the country's garment exports are mainly concentrated in the United States and the European Union. Alam and Natsuda found that during the Multi-Fibre Arrangement (MFA) period, only 21 out of 52 firms exported to a third market, but post-MFA, 66 out of 69 have exported to a third market, which indicates a diversification in the Bangladeshi garment industry. Bangladesh ranked as the second leading exporter in the world after China in 2015 according to an estimate by Khurram Shahzad who applied data derived from the World Trade Organization to Balassa's revealed comparative advantages (RCA) index. Shazad found that Bangladesh fell between Pakistan and India in regards to comparative advantages in textiles, but held the highest RCA for clothing. Private actors maintain a positive outlook on the industry, as the clothing sector has seen a positive growth in terms of RCA. Despite rating highly, Bangladesh's textile and clothing industries face several challenges that make access to their textile and clothing products unstable, such as a weak government and political turmoil.

Employment

Of the millions of wage earning children in Bangladesh in 1990, almost all of them worked in the ready-made garment industry. Based on the Bangladesh Bureau of Statistics Labor Force Survey estimated there were about 5.7 million 10- to 14-year-old children engaged in child labor. This number may have been as high as 15 million children. In 1993 employers in Bangladesh' ready-made garment (RMG) industry dismissed 50,000 children (c. 75 percent of child workers in the textile industry) out of fear of economic reprisals of the imminent passage of the Child Labor Deterrence Act (the Harkin Bill after Senator Tom Harkin, one of the US Senators who proposed the bill). The act which banned "importation to the United States of products which are manufactured or mined in whole or in part by children" would have resulted in the loss of lucrative American contracts. Its impact on Bangladesh's economy would have been significant as the export-oriented ready-made garment industry represents most of the country's exports.

The results of surveys varied on the demographics and size of the ready-made garments industry at the time of the Harkin Bill. One study estimated that there were 600,000 workers in the industry., BGMEA estimate was c. 800,000. The Asian-American Free Labor Institute (AAFLI)  reported that in 1994 females constituted about "90 percent of all adult workers, and roughly 60 percent of all child workers."

According to a New York Times journalist by August 2012 the garment or textile industry which exports worth $18 billion a year, accounted for "80 percent of manufacturing exports and more than three million jobs". According to the 2014 Bureau of International Labor Affairs's List of Goods Produced by Child Labor or Forced Labor, the Bangladeshi garments and textile industry still employs underage children as effective governmental measures are taking considerable time to be implemented.

Women in the garment industry
The structure of gender participation in the economy underwent a major shift with the rise of the ready-made garment industry in Bangladesh. Estimates from the World Bank put the number of female workers in the industry in the 1980s at 50,000; that number was brought up to 2.85 million by 2008 and now probably lies over the 3 million mark. Traditionally the participation of women in Bangladesh's formal economy was minimal. Bangladesh's flagship export-oriented ready-made garment industry, however, with female labor accounting for 90 percent of the work force,  was "built to a large extent, on the supply of cheap and flexible female labor in the country."
By 2001 the textile industry employed about 3 million workers of whom 90% were women.  In 2004 garment sector remained the largest employer of women in Bangladesh. By 2013, there were approximately 5,000 garment factories, employing about 4 million people, mostly women.

The garment sector has provided employment opportunities to women from the rural areas that previously did not have any opportunity to be part of the formal workforce. This has given women the chance to be financially independent and have a voice in the family because now they contribute financially.

However, women workers face problems. Most women come from low income families. Low wage of women workers and their compliance have enabled the industry to compete with the world market. Women are paid far less than men mainly due to their lack of education. Women are reluctant to unionize because factory owners threaten to fire them. Even though trade unionization is banned inside the Export processing Zones (EPZ), the working environment is better than that of the majority of garment factories that operate outside the EPZs. But, pressure from buyers to abide by labor codes has enabled factories to maintain satisfactory working conditions.

Working conditions

Garment workers have protested against their low wages. The first protests broke out in 2006, and since then, there have been periodic protests by the workers. This has forced the government to increase minimum wages of workers.

Many textile factories in Bangladesh often compromise worker health and safety because of the tough pressure from the ordering companies to make tight deadlines. Management will often push workers in order to ensure that an order is fulfilled. This poses a problem as workers have almost no avenues with which to file a complaint. Almost none of the factories have any sort of human resources department and local officials often turn a blind eye to violations. Moreover, most of these workers are poor women. Without any structure like a formalized union, many lack the ability to speak of injustices either from lack of knowledge or fear of losing economic security.

The lackluster enforcement of any safety mechanisms creates hazardous working conditions and negligible workers' rights even though Bangladesh has been a member of the International Labour Organization (ILO) since 1972 and the ILO been operating a Bangladeshi office since 1973. In that time Bangladesh has ratified 33 ILO agreements and eight "fundamental conventions," but there are still glaring gaps in protecting worker safety. Many experts then call on corporate organizations to take responsibility and place pressure on the government and factory owners to treat workers fairly.

Workers' health
After more than a century of industrial experience and development of national regulation and international conventions, workers in Bangladesh continue to lose their health and lives while contributing in the national enrichment. The scenario becomes worse when it comes to women workers. The female workers are exposed to different occupational health hazards such as work environment hazards, physical hazards and mental hazards. The work environment hazards include long working hours, absence of leave facilities, congested and overcrowded working conditions, absence of health facilities and safety measures, absence of staff amenities, lack of safe drinking water. On the other hand, the physical hazards include exposures to toxic agents, awkward postures and repetitive motion. Exposure to sexual, verbal and psychological harassment and violence at their work places are the some of the common mental health hazards. These hazards not only affect the female workers’ mental and physical being but also the quality of work and productivity of workforce nationwide.

Ergonomic hazards
Musculoskeletal disorders have been identified as an important concern among textile workers. These complaints are related to highly repetitive movements, awkward postures in seated positions, repetitive hand and arm movements, prolonged working hours without adequate breaks and poorly designed work stations. These risk factors result in adverse health outcomes of the workers such as musculoskeletal complaints of neck, back, hands, shoulders and lower limbs.

Most of the female workers in garments factories work as sewing operators, sewing operator helper, cutting personnel and finishing personnel. Sewing machines operators usually work in seated postures with forward flexion of the head, neck, and torso for long periods of time. This results in strain on the neck and back, and eventually to pain. A case study conducted by Habib M. among sewing machines operators in Bangladesh, found that the high risk of developing musculoskeletal disorders was related to working in a sitting position bending the neck more than 30° for more than 6 to 7 hours. Additionally, sitting in a forward flexed posture causes the lumbar spine to flatten that leads to an imbalanced disc pressure and a static contraction of the extensor muscles of the back. The flattened lumbar spine may cause back fatigue, disc degeneration and back injuries. But it is not only related to posture, design of the workstation can also worsen the problem. Sarder and colleagues found that seats in garment factories were devoid of a backrest, which would allow intermittent short breaks for resting the upper body from bending. Also, many seats are hard and wooden, without the cushion to prevent compression at the area of the ischial tuberosities. Even though some factories have sewing machines tables with height adjustability options 70 – 80 cm, workers rarely or never adjusted them because it takes between 10 and 15 minutes to adjust them.

Moreover, workers experience excessive hand work that involves gripping and pinching with the arm in constrained postures which causes wrist pain. Sewing machine operators are involve in highly repetitive movements of the elbows and wrists. Researchers have found that doing activities for stitching that involves wrist flexion of more than 45° wrist extension 10-12 times per minute, put the worker at higher risk of developing wrist and elbow problems.

These risk factors have a negative impact not only on the musculoskeletal health, but also on the medical cost, efficiency, and optimal performance on activities of daily living. Minimizing ergonomic risk factors through ergonomic intervention for workers is often neglected in many of the countries. The reasons may be the scarcity of relevant professionals and additional cost for implementations on which majority of the owners are less interested. Thus, there are high rate of musculoskeletal symptoms in different body parts among sewing machine operators which points out for proper interventions. To reduce awkward posture for the neck, back and shoulders, the sewing machine table, chair and paddle positions should be adjusted considering the worker's body height in a sitting position. The workers should be educated about the significance of postures on their health so that they do not neglect the instructions.

Policy and intervention
Up to the mid-1990s there was little evidence available that suggested that improvement involving ergonomics principles have been implemented in garment factories in South East Asia. Even though, solutions such as work surface modification and the adoption of adjustable chairs have been well documented, anecdotal information shows that there has been no improvement. The following recommendations can be implemented as solutions to reduce burden of musculoskeletal disorders among worker in the garment industries:
 Even though there are labor laws maintaining occupational health and safety, the overall standards are low due to the laxity of labor laws enforcement, and the owners not taking responsibility for maintaining and optimizing working conditions. The foremost initiative is the establishment of the policies in the garments factories and monitor them by a committee represented by both employers and employee.
 Promoting ergonomic practices at the factories can be one of the way to reduce ergonomic hazards among the workers. Proper storage and handling of heavy materials can play important role to reduce musculoskeletal issues. This intervention can include providing trolleys and wheeled multi-level rack to carry clothes and material (picture), reducing height difference to move materials manually, eliminating tasks requiring bending or twisting etc. This will prevent the workers to carry heavy loads manually and reduce back pains or muscle sprain.
 Workstation design is important to reduce awkward posture for the neck, back and shoulders. The sewing machine table, chair and paddle positions should be adjusted considering the worker's body height in a sitting position. Sewing machine table heights should be adjusted between 10 cm to 15 cm above elbow height for everyone. It should also have tilted 10° to 15° towards the operator and the needle at 20° backward inclination and the pedal position should be placed forward and adjusted per user's comfort. The adjustable desk height, inclined slope of the table, needle angle and the pedal position should induce a more upright position of the head, neck and trunk. Adjustment of the sewing machine table alone does not ensure good posture; adjustment of the chair is also an important factor. The chair should adjust between 51 cm and 61 cm; the backrest distance should adjust horizontally by about 5 cm and the backrest height should be fixed at 25 cm. Studies also show significant reduction of physical discomfort experienced by the sewing machine operators by changing the angle of seat pan and backrest of the chair.
 Since lack of knowledge about occupational diseases are found to be related with high musculoskeletal disorders, providing training to both employers and employees is a great way to address those issues.

Chemical hazards

Bleaching agents and azo dyes

There are a wide range of chemicals utilized in textile production for dyeing and printing, which these workers can be exposed to.  These chemicals include but are not limited to bleaching agents and azo dyes.  Azo dyes, such as aniline and benzadine, accounting for over 50% of dyes produced annually as of 2006.  This was due to their high stability in light and washing as well as resistance to microbial activity.  The toxic effects of these dyes include hypersensitivity and irritant effects such as contact dermatitis and asthma, as well as exposure related concerns for such malignancies as bladder, nasal, esophagus, stomach, colon, rectal, nasopharyngeal and lung cancers.  Studies have postulated that hypersensitivity effects may be due to alterations in neutrophil function and sensitization, contributing to chronic inflammatory diseases of the skin and respiratory tract.  Once this sensitization has occurred, an individual becomes more susceptible to developing allergic disease on subsequent contact with the offending agent. Exposure from these chemicals typically occurs via direct contact with the skin or inhalation of dye particles. While as of 2006 there was no evidence to suggest that most dyestuffs then in use in these industries were harmful at the levels workers were generally exposed to, there was concern with long term or accidental over-exposure.  This long term or excessive exposure can sensitize the worker's immune system, leading to hypersensitivity reactions such as asthma and atopic dermatitis on subsequent exposure as mentioned above.  Additionally, studies have demonstrated concerns regarding exposure to textile dyes and occupational bladder cancer due to aniline dye intermediates such as beta-naphthylamine and benzidine, which has long been identified as a human urinary carcinogen. The latency period between exposure and diagnosis has been estimated at up to 23 years.  As of 2006, screening recommendations for detection of long-term health effects from dye exposure included hematologic testing to look for microcytic anemia and leukopenia.  However, many females working in this industry did not have access to such screening and surveillance due to lack of quality medical care.

Sandblasting

Sandblasting is a technique used on denim to give the garment a worn look. The sand that is used is often composed of 95% quartz and 15% feldspar. Silicosis is an often-fatal lung disease caused by the exposure to respirable silica dust. Silicosis often leads to more severe lung diseases such as; lung cancer, Bronchitis, and Tuberculosis.  In 2003, Turkish investigators performed and published a case study in the Journal of Occupational Health on five sandblasting factories. They found workers inside poorly ventilated factories being exposed to respirable silica dust 20 times that of the recommended safety levels. This case study followed a sample of sandblasters from these factories, with a mean age of 23, and an employment duration of three years.  When the study concluded, over one third of the sandblasters had lab-confirmed silicosis and two workers had died during the study.

Prevention strategies
Exposing the dangers of sandblasting has forced government agencies to step in and attempt to contain and control the amount of dust exposure. One method of containing the silica dust is the addition of water. Average respirable particulate levels drastically declined after water spray controls were installed in a stone crusher mill in India. This measure brought to light the effectiveness of reducing silica exposure through relatively inexpensive modifications. It may take time to get these factories to comply with the Permissible Exposure Limit for silica but at least some measures are being implicated, or suggested, to have a positive health impact for the sandblasting workers.

Potassium permanganate
Another popular chemical involved in an alternate sandblasting technique is Potassium Permanganate or KMnO4. It is an odorless, dark purple, sand-like oxidizing agent. It is used to lighten the color of denim in specific areas. In the process of sand blasting, a worker sprays the potassium permanganate on a specific area on the denim garment with a hose or a brush. It is then washed off, leaving the chemical treated area a lighter color than the surrounding untreated area. When the potassium permanganate dries, bleach is sprayed on top of the previously treated area to neutralize potassium permanganate and is then washed a second time. There are multiple exposure routes for potassium permanganate to cause serious adverse reactions to the worker, these are: dermal contact, contact with the eye, inhalation and ingestion. When potassium permanganate comes in contact with the skin, it can cause irritation, deep burns, rashes and even dying of the skin. If potassium permanganate is exposed to the eye, severe irritation as well as permanent eye damage is possible. Inhalation of potassium permanganate can irritate the respiratory tract and can even lead to chronic lung diseases such as asthma, silicosis, and pulmonary edema. Ingestion of potassium permanganate causes severe nausea and diarrhea and lastly, some rare cases, chronic exposure to potassium permanganate could adversely affect the liver and kidneys and may even decrease fertility.

Noise-induced hearing loss
One work environment health risk that often gets overlooked is noise induced hearing loss (NIHL). NIHL has recently become one of the biggest occupational disease risks with occupational NIHL contributing to 16% of global deafness. Chronic exposure to high decibels can lead to the development of NIHL among manufacturing workers by damaging sensory hair cells in the inner ear. These two points illustrate how NIHL is a significant occupational health risk. Asia has, over the last 50 years, seen a significant growth in the manufacturing of both primary products and finished products. The increase in manufacturing has led to an increased exposure to high levels of noise and has contributed to increased NIHL among workers. In Bangladesh, occupations which have the greatest exposure to noisy work environments are automobile drivers, traffic police, shopkeepers, road-side hawkers, and garment workers. Garment workers in Bangladesh face noise levels of 96-100 Decibels Adjusted (dBA), which is a significant contributor to NIHL among women textile workers in Bangladesh. There are options available to protect workers from chronic exposure to high noise levels in the textile industry. Some simple measures which could be implemented on machinery would include such actions as decreasing noise and creating noise barriers. For workers, the use of personal protective equipment, as well as the establishing maximum daily exposures, can go a long way to mitigate worker exposures to chronic noise.

Factory crises
As of 2000, garment entrepreneurs had a reputation for bribery, shirking custom duties, evading corporate taxes, making inadequate long-term investments in the industry, and avoiding social projects such as education, healthcare, and disaster relief that would benefit their workers and the communities in which they operate. Despite these failings, authors Quddus and Salim argue that the success of the industry is largely attributable to these entrepreneurs. Bangladesh successfully competes in the manufacturing industry by maintaining "lowest labor costs in the world." Garment workers' minimum wage was set at roughly $37 a month in 2012 but since 2010 Bangladesh's double-digit inflation with no corresponding rise in minimum wage and labor rights, has led to protests. Following labour disputes in 2013, the minimum wage was raised to the equivalent of $68 a month. Many workers profited from the increase, but it was also expected to attract more young girls to factories.

Other major fires in 1990 and 2012, resulting in hundreds of accidental deaths, included those at That's It Sportswear Limited and the fire at Tazreen Fashions Ltd. Spectrum Sweater Industries, Phoenix Garments, Smart Export Garments, Garib and Garib, Matrix Sweater, KTS Composite Textile Mills and Sun Knitting. Major foreign buyers looking for outsourcing demand compliance-related norms and standards regarding a safe and healthy work environment which includes fire-fighting equipment, evacuation protocols and mechanisms and appropriate installation of machines in the whole supply-chain. RMG insiders in Bangladesh complain about the pressure to comply and argue that RMG factory owners are hampered by a shortage of space in their rental units. In spite of this the industry exports totaled $19 billion in 2011–2012. They expected export earnings to increase to $23 billion in 2012–2013.

In an effort to eliminate underlying problems and avoid further deadly tragedies in the RMG factories in 2010 Clean Clothes Campaign CCC, the International Labour Rights Forum (ILRF), the Worker Rights Consortium (WRC), and the Maquila Solidarity Network (MSN) contacted many of the RMG international buyers and offered a set of recommendations regarding measures that should be taken.
In 2012 the Bangladesh Garment Manufacturers and Exporters Association announced plans to expel 850 factories from its membership due to noncompliance with safety and labor standards. Members of the U.S. House of Representatives have also urged the U.S. Trade Representative's office to complete its review of Bangladesh's compliance with eligibility requirements for the Generalized System of Preferences.

Five deadly incidents from November 2012 through May 2013 brought worker safety and labor violations in Bangladesh to world attention putting pressure on big global clothing brands such as Primark, Loblaw, Joe Fresh, Gap, Walmart, Nike, Tchibo, Calvin Klein and Tommy Hilfiger, and retailers to respond by using their economic weight to enact change. No factory owner had ever been prosecuted over the deaths of workers. This changed with 41 murder charges filed relating to the 1,129 deaths which occurred during the 2013 Savar building collapse.

Scott Nova of the Worker Rights Consortium, a rights advocacy group, claimed that auditors, some of whom were paid by the factories they inspect, sometimes investigated workers right issues such as hours or child labor but did not properly inspect factories’ structural soundness or fire safety violations. Nova argued that the cost of compliance to safety standards in all 5,000 clothing factories in Bangladesh is about $3 billion (2013).
Immediately following 24 April deadly industrial accident, Mahbub Ahmed, the top civil servant in Bangladesh's Commerce Ministry, fearing the loss of contracts that represent 60 per cent of their textile industry exports, pleaded with the EU to not take tough, punitive measures or "impose any harsh trade conditions" on Bangladesh to "improve worker safety standards" that would hurt the "economically crucial textile industry" and lead to the loss of millions of jobs.
Two dozen factory owners are also Members of Parliament in Bangladesh.

That's It Sportswear Ltd fire 2010

On 14 December 2010 thirty people died and another 200 were seriously injured in a fire at the garment factory, "That's It Sportswear Ltd", owned by Hameem Group. International buyers of this factories products included "American Eagle, GAP/Old Navy, JC Penney, Kohl’s, Squeeze, Sears, VF Asia, Target Store, Charming Shoppes, Wal-Mart in USA market and H & M, Carrefour, Zara, HEMA, M & S Mode, ETAM, Western Store, Migros, Celio and PNC in Europe market." In February 2010 a deadly fire at the "Garib and Garib" factory killed 22.

2012 Tazreen Fashion factory fire

A fire broke out on 24 November 2012, in the Tazreen Fashion factory in Dhaka killing 117 people and injuring 200. It was the deadliest factory fire in the history of Bangladesh. According to The New York Times, Walmart played a significant role in blocking reforms to have retailers pay more for apparel in order to help Bangladesh factories improve safety standards. Walmart director of ethical sourcing, Sridevi Kalavakolanu, asserted that the company would not agree to pay the higher cost, as such improvements in electrical and fire safety in the 4,500 factories would be a "very extensive and costly modification" and that "it is not financially feasible for the brands to make such investments." As well, Walmart was the client for five of Tazreen apparel factory's 14 production lines. In response Walmart donated over a million dollars to the North South University,  Environment, Health and Safety Academy (EHS+) to improve fire safety in RMG factories in Bangladesh by the Institute for Sustainable Communities (ISC), a U.S.-based nonprofit. In December 2013, factory owner Delwar Hossain and 12 other factory officials were charged with "culpable homicide" for the deaths in the factory fire. It was likely the first time any garment factory owner in Bangladesh had been charged.

Rana Plaza collapse 2013

On 24 April 2013 over 1045 textile workers factories making clothes for Western brands were killed when a garment factory collapsed. It was the "world's deadliest industrial accident" since the Bhopal disaster in India in 1984. While some 2,500 were rescued from the rubble including many who were injured, the total number of those missing remained unknown weeks later. The building owner, Sohel Rana, built an additional two floors beyond his approved permit for a six-floor building. Rana, associated with the ruling Awami League, used "shoddy building materials, including substandard rods, bricks and cement, and did not obtaining the necessary clearances" and constructed the building on a "pond filled with sand". An engineer raised safety concerns after noticing cracks in the Rana Plaza complex the day before its collapse. In spite of this factories stayed open to fill overdue orders. When generators were restarted after a power blackout the building caved in. Six garment factories also in Rana Plaza were cleared to re-open on 9 May 2013 after inspectors allegedly issued safety certificates. Nine people were arrested including four factory owners, the owner of the complex and the engineer who warned of the crack in the building. Several prominent transnational companies had their products linked to the factories within the Rana Plaza building including retail giants "Wal-Mart, Mango, Dutch retailer C & A, Benetton Fashions, Cato Fashions, and the popular British chain Primark." While the incident raised international concern about the structural integrity and safety of many Bangladeshi textile factors, the industry actually saw a significant rise. Over the time from the collapse to March 2014, exports increased by over 16% resulting in $23.9 billion US dollars.

In June 2015 after a two-year investigation homicide charges were filed against 42 people in the 2013 collapse of a factory Rana Plaza that killed more than 1,136 people in April 2013. Sohel Rana, the building owner, Refat Ullah, mayor at the time of the incident along with owners of five garment factories located in the Rana Plaza, and "dozens of local council officials and engineers" were charged with culpable homicide, "which carries a maximum sentence of life in prison under Bangladeshi law."

Bangladesh Garment Manufacturers and Exporters Association report
Bangladesh Garment Manufacturers and Exporters Association (BGMEA) is a recognised trade body that represents export-oriented garment manufacturers and garment exporters of the country. The fundamental objective of BGMEA is to establish a healthy business environment for a close and mutually beneficial relationship between manufacturers, exporters and importers, thereby ensuring steady growth in the foreign exchange earnings of the country. After the Savar collapse, the BGMEA assembled an 11-member committee to investigate the causes of the tragedy. In its final report BGMEA pinned the blame on inspection officials who granted permits to factory owners to install heavy machinery on the two floors not authorized to exist in the first place and on local officials for neglecting to ensure proper oversight of building plans. The report also indicated that building owner Sohel Rana may have been able to corrupt municipal officials by offering bribes.

Mirpur textile factory fire 2013
On 9 May 2013 eight people were killed when a fire broke out at a textile factory in an eleven-story building in the Mirpur industrial district owned by Tung Hai Group, a large garment exporter. The president of the politically powerful textile industry lobby group, the Bangladesh Garment Manufacturers and Exporters Association (BGMEA), told Reuters that "the Bangladeshi managing director of the company and a senior police officer were among the dead."

, efforts to improve safety were being coordinated under "an unprecedented comprehensive "Accord on Fire and Building Safety" ... Around 180 companies - mostly from Europe - international and local trade unions, Bangladeshi employers, exporters and government are part of this agreement." In addition, an "Alliance for Bangladesh Worker Safety - an association of 26 American companies including CAP and Wal-Mart" seeks to address these issues from an entrepreneurial standpoint, without participation of trade unions. Together the two groups "are responsible for inspecting around 2,100 factories over a period of five years." , progress had been made in inspecting about 600 factories. A spokesman stated that "Ten factories have been submitted to the Government Established Review Panel and most have been either closed completely or partially."

Aftermath of crises
In June 2013 President Barack Obama announced that U.S. trade privileges for Bangladesh, the Generalized System of Preferences (GSP), were suspended following the deadly 24 April 2013 collapse of Rana Plaza, considered to be the global garment industry's worst accident. In 2007, the American Federation of Labor and Congress of Industrial Organizations (AFL-CIO) had submitted a petition under the GSP benefits to the Office of the United States Trade Representative (USTR) "alleging a number of worker rights issues in export processing zones, the ready-made garments (RMG) sector, and the seafood processing sector." This investigated was expedited as concerns over labour rights and RMG factory safety concerns increased in 2012 with more deadly accidents and the unsolved killing in 2012 of prominent trade unionist Aminul Islam.

In addition, international pressure from human rights organizations, labor organizations, NGOs, and consumers from Western nations pushed corporate retailers to play a larger role in protecting worker safety. The Accord on Fire and Building Safety in Bangladesh, a legally binding document, obligates retailers to cooperate with safety inspections and provide financial assistance to building owners in order to ensure that the standards of such inspections are met. The national Bangladeshi government also updated is own legislation by adding stipulations to the 2006 Bangladesh Labor Act. Employers will now set aside 5% of their funds for an "employee welfare fund" and will no longer be able to prevent the formation of worker unions.

In October 2013, the Government of Bangladesh (GoB) and the International Labour Organization (ILO) launched the "Improving Working Conditions in the Ready-Made Garment Sector" (RMGP) Program, a US$24.21 million, three-and-a-half year initiative. The United Kingdom and the Netherlands jointly contributed US$15 million. "Rana Plaza and Tazreen became the symbols of what is wrong in the RMG sector." Ms. Sarah Cook, UK's Department for International Development (DFID) Head in Bangladesh said that the RMGP was a "key part of the UK's approach to help ensure safe working conditions and improved productivity" in the RMG sector and that the "sustainability of the ready-made garment industry has a pivotal role to play in Bangladesh's continued social and economic development."

The Alliance for Bangladesh Worker Safety officially began operations in Dhaka on 9 December 2013. It is a five-year independent and legally binding agreement between 26 North American companies that is still being enforced. So far, at least 25 cases have been brought to the alliance for review and four factories have officially been closed.

One of the main concerns after the crises is the structural integrity of RMG and textile factories. The Government of Bangladesh has made changes in this regard. Working with the ILO, the government has upgraded the Chief Inspector of Factories and associated Establishment office to a "department", hired additional labor, fire, and building inspectors, implemented additional training programs for inspectors, and created a database of all factories to facilitate inspections. Many factories have been inspected since these changes were made, but there are still about 1,000 factories that have not been checked either because they are not registered with any organization or they have listed the wrong address which takes time away from inspectors. Pointing to the slow development of the regulation of this industry particularly after such a major human disaster, Dr Mia Rahim opines that Bangladesh should more focus on the challenges and opportunities of local regulation of this industry. He suggests that the RMG manufacturing and supply industry should not only depend on the prescriptions of the global buyers but also adopt a 'new governance' approach in the local regulation framework of this industry.

Sustainability 
In March 2021, 10 years after their report "Bangladesh's ready-made garments landscape: the challenge of growth" McKinsey & Company reflected on the country’s development, with the article "What’s next for Bangladesh’s garment industry, after a decade of growth?". The consulting firm affirms Bangladesh's textile sector will need to innovate, upgrade, and diversify, investing in flexibility, worker welfare, infrastructure and sustainability. 

Bangladesh, like many other textile hubs worldwide, needs to make a fundamental shift toward a demand-driven and more sustainable sourcing model. There is an increasing consumer demand for environmentally friendly products, and concerns about climate change are shedding a light on the country manufacturing processes.

In 2021, Bangladesh ranked 97 out of 115 countries in the World Economic Forum's Energy Transition Index. Like other emerging and developing Asian countries, Bangladesh has a fast transition rate compared to other regions but still needs to improve, and it will require strong investments in infrastructure and renewable energy. 

The sector’s participation in new industry initiatives regarding climate change and circularity has advanced the sustainability agenda, for example through the Circular Fashion Partnership. The Circular Fashion Partnership is a cross-sectorial project to support the development of the textile recycling industry in Bangladesh by capturing and directing post-production fashion waste back into the production of new fashion products. The initiative is led by Global Fashion Agenda, with the participation of brands and retailers such as Primark or C&A, and global and local producers such as Recover Textile Systems or Cyclo®. 

Furthermore, more than 1,500 Bangladeshi companies are certified by the Global Organic Textile Standard, the second highest number in any country in the world.

Cultural shifts

Mohammad Yunus and Tatsufumi Yamagata, researchers in international development, state that "the garment industry was the main driver of the globalization of Bangladesh". Throughout the 1980s and continuing into modern day, the increase in total exports matched the increase in garment exports, indicating that this sector is responsible for a significant portion of Bangladesh's economic growth. The European Union and the United States are the biggest importers of Bangladeshi garments, making up 88.6% of export destinations.

The garment industry has been praised by many as a major contributor to poverty reduction in Bangladesh. Proponents of this view argue that entry-level wages were enough to keep workers above the local poverty line, even if they were paid much less than other textile and garment factory workers comparatively.

The overwhelming majority of workers, about two-thirds, in the textile and garment industries of Bangladesh are women. In fact, the birth of the industry essentially created the entryway for a "whole generation of young, unmarried females, mainly from rural areas, into the industrial labor force." Approximately 29.3% of women in this sector are illiterate and many suggest that this is a better alternative to other options they may have. However, use of these women is seen as a justification for low wages (the national minimum was $37 a month before the Rana Plaza collapse).

A limitation on poverty reduction effects provided by the textile industry is the obvious work hazards associated with working in a factory. Welfare of garment workers is compromised by "long working hours, insufficient sanitation and medical facilities, dust and heat, as well as abuse and discrimination."

As of 2017 the industry was adopting greening standards. As of that time, according to US Green Building Council (USGBC) project in Bangladesh, there were 20 Gold, 13 Platinum, and 5 (five) Silver-certified RMG factories while around 78 factories were in the certification process.

Education in the textile sector
 Bangladesh University of Textiles (BUTEX) is the only public university specializing in textile engineering in Bangladesh. It graduated from a college to a full-flagged university on 22 December 2010 by an ordinance of Education Ministry. It has a glorious history starting as a weaving school under British colonial rule in 1921. Now the university offers graduation courses in Textile Engineering, Industrial Production Engineering, Textile Management & Fashion design,Textile Machinery Design & Maintenance.
 Mawlana Bhashani Science and Technology University (MBSTU) started B.Sc. in Textile Engineering from session 2005–2006, first in Bangladesh. The department had been awarded a sub-project entitled "Improving the undergraduate program and launching MS program in the Department of Textile Engineering (TE)" under Higher Education Quality Enhancement Project (HEQEP) funded by World Bank and University Grants Commission of Bangladesh. M.Sc. in Textile Engineering had inaugurated for the first time in Bangladesh by this department in 2011 under HEQEP project.
 Khulna University of Engineering and Technology (KUET) started B.Sc. in Textile Engineering from session 2012–2013.
 Jashore University of Science and Technology (JUST), started B.Sc. in Textile Engineering from session 2017–2018.
 National Institute of Textile Engineering and Research (NITER), is a Public Private Partnership (PPP) textile school in Savar, Dhaka, Bangladesh, offering the Bachelor of Science degree in Textile Engineering in coordination with the University of Dhaka. The school is a partnership between the "Bangladesh Textile Mills Association" and the Government of Bangladesh Ministry of Textiles and Jute. It provides B.Sc. in Textile Engineering with Five major specializations and B.Sc. in Industrial Production Engineering
 STEC, is a Private textile institute in Mohammadpur, Dhaka, Bangladesh, offering the Bachelor of Science degree in Textile Engineering in coordination with the University of Dhaka. It provides B.Sc. in Textile Engineering with Five major specializations.
 BGMEA University of Fashion and Technology started functioning in 2000 and was affiliated to the National University, Bangladesh in 2001. BUFT is conducting a two-year MBA course in Apparel Merchandising and a four-year B.Sc. (Hons) course in Apparel Manufacture & Technology (AMT), B.Sc. (Hons) in Knitwear Manufacture & Technology (KMT) and B.Sc. (Hons) in Fashion Design & Technology (FDT). It has some diploma courses.

There are government and private textile engineering colleges under universities that offer B.Sc. in Textile Engineering courses including specialization in yarn manufacturing, fabric manufacturing, wet processing, garments manufacturing and fashion design. The institutions are as below:
 Bangladesh University of Textiles, Dhaka, Bangladesh
 Mawlana Bhashani Science and Technology University, Tangail
 Khulna University of Engineering & Technology, Khulna, Bangladesh.
 Dhaka University of Engineering and Technology, Joydevpur, Gazipur, Bangladesh
 Jashore University of Science and Technology, Jashore, Bangladesh
 Bangabandhu Textile Engineering College, Tangail
 Bangladesh University of Business and Technology, Mirpur, Dhaka
 National Institute of Textile Engineering and Research, Savar
 Shyamoli Textile Engineering College Shyamoli Textile Engineering College(STEC), Dhaka
 Textile Engineering College, Noakhali, Noakhali
 Pabna Textile Engineering College
 Textile Engineering College, Chittagong, Chittagong
 Port City International University, Chittagong
 Abdur Rab Seriniabad Textile Engineering College, Barisal
 Green University Of Bangladesh, Mirpur, Dhaka
 BGMEA University of Fashion and Technology, Dhaka, Bangladesh
 European University of Bangladesh, Shyamoli, Dhaka
 Southeast University, Dhaka
 Daffodil International University, Dhanmondi, Dhaka
 Ahsanullah University of Science & Technology, Tejgaon, Dhaka
 City University, Banani, Dhaka
 Primeasia University, Banani, Dhaka
 Northern University Bangladesh, Banani, Dhaka
 University of South Asia, Banani, Dhaka
 Uttara University, Uttara
 World University of Bangladesh, Dhanmondi, Dhaka
 The People's University Of Bangladesh, Uttara, Dhaka
 Shanto-Mariam University of Creative Technology, Dhaka
 The National Institute of Fashion Technology (NIFT)
 Dr M A Wazed Miah Textile Engineering College

Gallery

See also
 Child labour in Bangladesh
 List of companies of Bangladesh
 Next Eleven
 3G countries
 Export-oriented employment

References

Further reading
  These popular books published in 2002 along with the Rhee 1990 journal article have contributed to making the phenomenal growth of the garment industry in Bangladesh widely known.
 
 An Introduction to the Bangladesh Clothing Manufacturing Industry
 Top 10 Clothing Factories in Bangladesh

 01
Bangladeshi clothing
Industry in Bangladesh
Manufacturing companies of Bangladesh